Tirupattur, also transliterated as Tiruppattur, Tirupathur, Thirupattur, Thiruppattur, or Thiruppathur is a common place-name in Tamil Nadu, India. It may refer to:

Sivaganga district 
Tiruppattur, Sivaganga, a panchayat town in Sivaganga district
Tiruppattur block, a revenue block in Sivaganga district
Tiruppattur, Sivaganga Assembly constituency, state assembly 194 in Sivaganga district

Tirupattur district 
Tirupattur, the headquarters of the eponymous district
Tirupattur block, a revenue block in Tirupattur district
Tirupattur district, a district carved out from Vellore district in 2019
Tirupattur division, a revenue division in Tirupattur district
Tirupattur taluk, a taluk in Tirupattur district
 Tiruppattur, Vellore Assembly constituency
Tiruppattur railway station, a station serving the town

Other districts
Tirupattur (Lok Sabha constituency), a defunct Lok Sabha constituency
Thiruppattur, Tiruchirappalli, a village in Tiruchirappalli district
Tiruppattur, Vellore Assembly constituency, a state assembly constituency in Vellore district